Aethria ornata is a moth of the subfamily Arctiinae. It was described by Édouard Ménétries in 1857. It is found in Brazil.

References

Moths described in 1857
Arctiinae
Moths of South America